Wertz is a surname. Notable people with the surname include:

Vic Wertz, American baseball player
Matt Wertz, American singer-songwriter
Ricki Wertz, American television personality
George M. Wertz, American politician, teacher, and publisher
David Frederick Wertz, American bishop